Yasna Angélica Vukasovic Álvarez (born c. 1969) was Chilean delegate for Miss World 1987. She comes from Punta Arenas, Chile and is of Croat origin. She has 3 daughters, 1 son and one grandson (Vicente).
Yasna currently lives in Santiago, and among her various activities she is a certified PNL coach, producer and insurance agent.

References

External links
  Chilean Charm, el Universo de las Reinas de Belleza Entrevista a Jasna Vukasovic - Miss Mundo Chile 1987
  Radio Magallanes - La Radio Interactiva de la Patagonia La academia de modelos de Yasna Vukasovic cumplirá 20 años de existencia, la miss chile confiesa sus penas y alegrías en exclusiva en Radio Magallanes, Feb 25, 2009
  Yasna Vukasovic, de Punta Arenas al Miss Mundo

Living people
Chilean people of Croatian descent
Miss World Chile winners
Miss World 1987 delegates
People from Punta Arenas
1960s births